Andrew Adrian Garcia (born October 18, 1985) is an American singer who was the ninth place finalist on the ninth season of American Idol. Garcia has released two EPs and numerous standalone singles. He has also collaborated with several artists.

In 2014, Garcia was featured on the track "GTFO My Room" by Ryan Higa, which placed on the Billboard World Digital Song Sales chart. That same year, Garcia was part of a group whose rendition of "Roar" received a Streamy Award nomination for Best Cover Song. Garcia was also featured on the song "Airplanes and Terminals", which received a Streamy Award nomination for Best Original Song.

Early life and career
According to The New York Times, Garcia was "already something of a star" by the time he auditioned for American Idol, due to popularity he had accumulated covering songs on YouTube.

American Idol
Garcia auditioned for the ninth season in Pasadena, California. He sang "Sunday Morning" by Maroon 5 and was praised by all the judges, notably Simon Cowell, who called him a "genuinely good singer," as well as guest judge Katy Perry. He later appeared in Hollywood, where he sang Paula Abdul's song "Straight Up" and since has been particularly known for that performance.

Garcia was eliminated on April 14, 2010 along with Katie Stevens.

Performances/Results

 When Ryan Seacrest announced the results for this particular night, Garcia was among the Bottom 3 but declared safe second, as Michael Lynche was saved from elimination by the judges.
 Due to the judges using their one save to save Michael Lynche, the Top 9 remained intact for another week.

Post-Idol
Garcia was featured in the American Idols LIVE! Tour 2010, where he sang "Straight Up" by Paula Abdul and "Sunday Morning" by Maroon 5.

Garcia released his first single "Crazy" on June 7, 2011. That same year, he was featured on the track "BRB" from the album DFD, by the artist Dumbfoundead.

In 2011, Garcia performed shows with a group called Yesterday, Today, Forever (or YTF), a musical and comedy performing group. The group performed their first concert on October 9, 2011 in Honolulu, Hawaii.

In 2013 Garcia released the single "Dumb".

Garcia has appeared in Nigahiga videos, and in 2014, the two collaborated on the song "GTFO My Room", which peaked at No. 6 on the Billboard Comedy Digital Track Sales chart. That same year, Garcia shared a Streamy Award nomination for Best Cover Song with Andy Lange, Chester See, and Josh Golden for their rendition of "Roar". Another song by Garcia, "Airplanes and Terminals", received a 2014 Streamy Award nomination for Best Original Song. Garcia recorded "Airplanes & Terminals" with G Seven and Traphik.

In 2015, Garcia released the EP Hell and Back. The track "Ghost" was released as a single in 2014, leading up to the EP's release. That same year, Garcia was featured on the track "Waiting" from the EP Redline, by Avalon Young, who a year later, placed in the top 8 on American Idols fifteenth season. In 2016, Garcia released the non-album single "Too Fast".

In 2017, Garcia released the EP, Love Wounds. A week before the EP's release, the single "Hurts Like Hell" premiered on Billboard. Garcia also released three non-album singles in 2017: "Colder", "Hold You Down", and "Hollywood Hills".

Mark Franklin of The York Dispatch positively reviewed both of Garcia's EPs, calling "Ghost" a "standout" from Hell and Back and praising Love Wounds for its "impassioned ballads".

In 2018, Garcia released the non-album singles "Lose You" and "Groupie".

Garcia went on the Sweet290 tour with Brian Puspos, August Rigo and J. Rabon.

Discography

EPs

Singles

As featured artist

Awards and nominations

References

External links

Andrew Garcia at American Idol

1985 births
Living people
American Idol participants
Hispanic and Latino American musicians
Singers from California
People from Moreno Valley, California
American musicians of Mexican descent
21st-century American guitarists
Guitarists from California
American male guitarists
21st-century American male singers
21st-century American singers